There are at least 31 game and 59 non-game fish species known to occur in Montana.  Among Montana's fish, three are listed as endangered or threatened species and the Montana Department of Fish, Wildlife and Parks lists a number of species as species of concern.

Species are listed by common name, scientific name, typical habitat and occurrence.  Common and scientific names are from the Montana Field Guide.

Game fish

Trout

Order: Salmoniformes, Family: Salmonidae
 Native species
 Westslope cutthroat trout, Oncorhynchus clarkii lewisi (Salish: Pisɫ) 
 Yellowstone cutthroat trout, Oncorhynchus clarkii bouvieri
 Columbia River redband trout, Oncorhynchus mykiss gairdneri
 Bull trout, Salvelinus confluentus (Salish: Aáy or Ɫaʔáy; Kutenai: Tuhuǂ) 
 Arctic grayling, Thymallus arcticus
 Lake trout, Salvelinus namaycush
 Mountain whitefish, Prosopium williamsoni (Salish: X̣ʷy̓u) 
 Pygmy whitefish, Prosopium coulteri
 Lake whitefish, Coregonus clupeaformis

 Non-native, exotic species
 Rainbow trout, Oncorhynchus mykiss (Other than the red band subspecies, rainbow trout are an introduced species in Montana)
 Brown trout, Salmo trutta
 Golden trout, Oncorhynchus mykiss aguabonita
 Brook trout, Salvelinus fontinalis
 Chinook salmon, Oncorhynchus tshawytscha
 Kokanee salmon, Oncorhynchus nerka
 Cisco, Coregonus artedi

Paddlefish

Order: Acipenseriformes, Family: Polyodontidae
 Paddlefish, Polyodon spathula

Pike
Order: Esociformes, Family: Esocidae
 Non-native, exotic species
 Northern pike, Esox lucius
 Tiger muskellunge, Esox masquinongy × lucius

Bass, Sunfish

Order: Perciformes, Family: Centrarchidae
 Non-native, exotic species
 Black crappie, Pomoxis nigromaculatus
 Largemouth bass, Micropterus salmoides
 Smallmouth bass, Micropterus dolomieu
 White crappie, Pomoxis annularis

Perch

Order: Perciformes, Family: Percidae
 Native species
 Sauger, Sander canadensis
 Non-native, exotic species
 Yellow perch, Perca flavescens
 Walleye, Sander vitreus

Catfish
Order: Siluriformes, Family: Ictaluridae
 Native species
 Channel catfish, Ictalurus punctatus

Sturgeon
Order: Acipenseriformes, Family: Acipenseridae 
 Native species
 Pallid sturgeon, Scaphirhynchus albus
 Shovelnose sturgeon, Scaphirhynchus platorynchus
 White sturgeon, Acipenser transmontanus

Burbot

Order: Gadiformes, Family: Gadidae
 Native species
 Burbot, Lota lota

Non-game fish

Bass, sunfish

Order: Perciformes, Family: Centrarchidae
 Non-native, exotic species
 Bluegill, Lepomis macrochirus
 Green sunfish, Lepomis cyanellus
 Pumpkinseed, Lepomis gibbosus
 Rock bass, Ambloplites rupestris

Perch
Order: Perciformes, Family: Percidae
 Native species
 Iowa darter, Etheostoma exile

Temperate basses
Order: Perciformes, Family: Moronidae
 Non-native, exotic species
 White bass, Morone chrysops

Catfish

Order: Siluriformes, Family: Ictaluridae
 Native species
 Stonecat, Noturus flavus
 Non-native, exotic species
 Black bullhead, Ameiurus melas
 Yellow bullhead, Ameiurus natalis

Drum
Order: Perciformes, Family: Sciaenidae
 Native species
 Freshwater drum, Aplodinotus grunniens

Smelt
Order: Salmoniformes, Family: Osmeridae
Non native, exotic species
Rainbow smelt, Osmerus mordax

Gars 

Order: Lepisosteiformes. Family: Lepisosteidae
 Native species
 Shortnose gar, Lepisosteus platostomus

Mooneyes
Order: Hiodontiformes, Family: Hiodontidae
 Native species
 Goldeye, Hiodon alosoides

Mollies

Order: Cyprinodontiformes, Family: Poeciliidae
 Non-native, exotic species
 Green swordtail, Xiphophorus helleri
 Sailfin molly, Poecilia latipinna
 Shortfin molly, Poecilia mexicana
 Variable platyfish, Xiphophorus variatus
 Western mosquitofish, Gambusia affinis

Killifish
Order: Cyprinodontiformes, Family: Fundulidae
 Non-Native, exotic species
 Northern Plains killifish, Fundulus kansae
 Banded killifish, "Fundulus diaphanus"

Minnows

Order: Cypriniformes, Family: Cyprinidae
 Native species
 Brassy minnow, Hybognathus hankinsoni
 Emerald shiner, Notropis atherinoides
 Fathead minnow, Pimephales promelas
 Flathead chub, Platygobio gracilis
 Golden shiner, Notemigonus crysoleucas
 Longnose dace, Rhinichthys cataractae
 Northern pikeminnow, Ptychocheilus oregonensis (Salish: Qʷq̓é) 
 Northern redbelly dace, Phoxinus eos
 Peamouth, Mylocheilus caurinus
 Allegheny pearl dace, Margariscus margarita
 Northern pearl dace, Margariscus nachtriebi
 Plains minnow, Hybognathus placitus
 Redside shiner, Richardsonius balteatus
 Sand shiner, Notropis stramineus
 Sicklefin chub, Macrhybopsis meeki
 Western silvery minnow, Hybognathus argyritis
 Sturgeon chub, Macrhybopsis gelida
 Lake chub, Couesius plumbeus
 Creek chub, Semotilus atromaculatus
 Non-native, exotic species
 Goldfish, Carassius auratus
 Common carp, Cyprinus carpio
 Spottail shiner, Notropis hudsonius
 Utah chub, Gila atraria

Suckers

Order: Cypriniformes, Family: Catostomidae
 Native species
 Bigmouth buffalo, Ictiobus cyprinellus
 Blue sucker, Cycleptus elongatus
 Largescale sucker, Catostomus macrocheilus
 Longnose sucker, Catostomus catostomus
 Mountain sucker, Catostomus platyrhynchus
 River carpsucker, Carpiodes carpio
 Shorthead redhorse, Moxostoma macrolepidotum
 Smallmouth buffalo, Ictiobus bubalus
 White sucker, Catostomus commersoni

Mudminnows
Order: Esociformes, Family: Umbridae
 Non-native, exotic species
 Central mudminnow, Umbra limi

Sculpins

Order: Scorpaeniformes, Family: Cottidae
 Native species
 Deepwater sculpin, Myoxocephalus thompsonii
 Mottled sculpin, Cottus bairdi
 Slimy sculpin, Cottus cognatus
 Spoonhead sculpin, Cottus ricei
 Torrent sculpin, Cottus rhotheus

Sticklebacks

Order: Gasterosteiformes, Family: Gasterosteidae
 Native species
 Brook stickleback, Culaea inconstans

Trout-perch
Order: Percopsiformes, Family: Percopsidae
 Native species
Trout-perch, Percopsis omiscomaycus

See also
 List of amphibians and reptiles of Montana
 Birds of Montana
 List of non-marine molluscs of Montana
 Fishes of Yellowstone National Park

Further reading

Notes

Fish
Montana
.Montana
.Montana
Fish